Żółwin may refer to the following places:
Żółwin, Międzyrzecz County in Lubusz Voivodeship (west Poland)
Żółwin, Strzelce-Drezdenko County in Lubusz Voivodeship (west Poland)
Żółwin, Masovian Voivodeship (east-central Poland)